Maung Nu, also known as Monu Para, is a village in the Buthidaung Township of Rakhine State, Myanmar, near the Bangladesh–Myanmar border. It is the site of an alleged massacre by the Myanmar Army, carried out against Rohingyas in the village on 27 August 2017.

References

Populated places in Rakhine State